The AA mine discharger was a Japanese anti-aircraft weapon of the Second World War. The device was a simple tube like an infantry mortar of 70 mm or 81 mm caliber. Each mine was equipped with its own parachute. When fired, the mortar threw the shell to a range of 3,000 to 4,000 feet (900 to 1,200 m) and a maximum altitude of approximately 600 m. The shell ejected the mines at the top of its arc. They would then float down on their parachutes. They were fused to detonate on contact or after a fixed time period, damaging nearby aircraft. The projectile could alternatively be launched using a standard Type 11 70 mm infantry mortar. 	

The weapon could also be used like a simple cluster bomb, by firing over enemy troops.

External links

 http://www3.plala.or.jp/takihome/aa.htm
 http://www.lonesentry.com/articles/jp_ormoc/
 https://web.archive.org/web/20050219144251/http://www.ibiblio.org/hyperwar/Japan/IJA/HB/HB-9-2.html

See also
Unrotated projectile a British rocket launched parachute aerial mine system for ship defence.

External links

World War II anti-aircraft guns
Anti-aircraft guns of Japan
World War II weapons of Japan
9
World War II infantry weapons of Japan
Infantry mortars of Japan
Military equipment introduced in the 1940s